The Liebe ist für alle da Tour was a concert tour by German band Rammstein that took place from 2009 through 2011, in support of their sixth studio album, Liebe ist für alle da.  The tour consisted of six legs and took place in Europe, North America, South America, New Zealand, Australia and South Africa. During the tour, Rammstein would perform in the countries of Turkey and South Africa. The band would perform in the United States and Canada for the first time since their 2001 Mutter tour.

Rammstein headlined every performance throughout the tour, sometimes sharing headlining status at festival appearances. Their main support act was Combichrist, but also included Lacuna Coil, Skunk Anansie, Brand New Blood, and Kanatran. The tour consisted of six legs and 111 shows, beginning on November 8, 2009 and finishing on May 31, 2011.

Set lists

Tour dates 

Cancelled dates

Additional notes 
Early in the tour the band played "Seemann" in between "Ich will" and "Engel" but dropped it shortly after the tour began.
Due to the song "Ich tu dir weh" being banned by the Federal Government of Germany, the band played "Asche zu Asche" or "Rein raus" in its place at their German concerts until the ban was lifted. They also played a censored version of the song originally.
They played the song "Amerika" once during this tour in Basel, Switzerland in November 2009.
"Rosenrot" was performed in the first private rehearsal show for the Rammstein fan club in Berlin in October 2009, but it didn't make it to the tour set list.
In Argentina the song "Waidmanns Heil" was interrupted and started again about 10 minutes later for security reasons.
On the December 2009 dates in Hamburg, Copenhagen and Rostock, Alf Ator from the band Knorkator replaced Christian Lorenz on keyboards, because of illness.

References 

Rammstein concert tours
2009 concert tours
2010 concert tours
2011 concert tours
Concerts at Malmö Arena